The University of Maine School of Law Building is an academic building in Portland, Maine. Adjacent to the University of Southern Maine's Portland campus, the 8 story building was designed by the local architectural firm of Wadsworth, Boston, Dimick, Mercer and Weatherill and completed in 1972 at a cost of $2.7 million. It expanded in 1993 to include more space on the first floor to accommodate the law library. It is a rare example of Brutalist architecture in Maine. It was built to house the University of Maine School of Law, which had previously been located downtown at 68 High Street.

The first floor holds the School's law library. Other floors house USM's Edmund S. Muskie Institute of Public Affairs, as well as the offices of the President and the Provost. In 2017, Architectural Digest named the building one of the 8 ugliest in the United States and called it "a futuristic version of the Roman Colosseum." University employees described the building's architecture and design as "a joke but also a badge" and "rather unfortunate."

References

Educational buildings in Portland, Maine
Building
Buildings at the University of Southern Maine
1972 establishments in Maine
University and college buildings completed in 1972
Brutalist architecture in Maine